Van Buren Township is one of eleven townships in Fountain County, Indiana. As of the 2010 census, its population was 2,972 and it contained 1,308 housing units.

Geography

Cities and towns
 Veedersburg

Unincorporated towns
 Harrison Lake
 Hunter Corner
 Simpson Corner
 Stone Bluff
(This list is based on USGS data and may include former settlements.)

Major highways
 Interstate 74
 U.S. Route 41
 U.S. Route 136

Cemeteries
The township contains three cemeteries: Bonebrake, Cold Springs and Rock Field.

References
 United States Census Bureau cartographic boundary files
 U.S. Board on Geographic Names

External links
 Indiana Township Association
 United Township Association of Indiana

Townships in Fountain County, Indiana
Townships in Indiana